The 1981–82 DDR-Oberliga season was the 34th season of the DDR-Oberliga, the top level of ice hockey in East Germany. Two teams participated in the league, and SC Dynamo Berlin won the championship.

Game results

Dynamo Berlin wins series 20:0 in points

References

External links
East German results 1970-1990

1989-90
Ger
Oberliga
1981 in East German sport
1982 in East German sport